Academy Street Historic District may refer to:

Academy Street Historic District (Madison, North Carolina), listed on the National Register of Historic Places (NRHP) in Rockingham County, North Carolina 
Academy Street Historic District (Poughkeepsie, New York), NRHP-listed